Newrest Wagons-Lits, formerly  (lit. International Sleeping-Car Company), also CIWL, Compagnie des Wagons-Lits, or just Wagons-Lits, is a division of  particularly known for its on-train catering and sleeping car services, as well as being the historical operator of the Orient Express.

The Orient Express was a showcase of luxury and comfort at a time when travelling was still rough and dangerous. CIWL soon developed a dense network of luxury trains all over Europe, whose names are still remembered today and associated with the art of luxury travel. Examples of such luxury travel include the Blue Train, the Golden Arrow, the North Express and many more. CIWL became the first and most important modern multinational dedicated to transport, travel agency, hospitality with activities spreading from Europe to Asia and Africa.

Now part of the French Newrest group, Compagnie Internationale des Wagons-Lits (et des grands express européens) (English: The International Sleeping-Car (and European Great Expresses) Company) was founded by the Belgian Georges Nagelmackers in 1872, in Belgium. CIWL quickly established itself as the premier provider and operator of European railway sleepers and dining cars during the late 19th and the 20th centuries.

The holding company, CIWLT, is a fully owned subsidiary of Accor, the historical brands were transferred to Wagons-Lits Diffusion in 1996.

History

Monopoly 

During his trip to the United States in 1867–1868 the 23-year-old Belgian Georges Nagelmackers was impressed by the Pullman night trains. Upon his return home, he decided to establish a network of such trains in Europe. He envisioned that such trains should be luxurious and travel across borders.

In 1874 Nagelmackers founded the Compagnie Internationale des Wagons-Lits and the et des Grands Express Européens addition became part of the name ten years later. By 1886 his company had become the main organiser for most European heads of state. The symbol "WL" held by two lions became a well-known trade mark.

The company ran either complete trains of Wagon-Lits cars or individual sleeping and dining cars coupled onto services operated by the state railways of the European countries through which the Wagon-Lits cars passed. These cars were always drawn by locomotives of the various state railways, as Wagon-Lits did not operate its own fleet of locomotives.

Prior to World War I, CIWL held a monopoly being the only group catering to the needs of the international railroad traveller. The company introduced famous services, such as the Orient Express, the Nord Express, and the Sud Express and expanded to markets outside Europe with involvement in the Trans-Siberian Railway across Russia. The Company's trains also reached Manchuria (Trans-Manchurian Express), China (Peking, Shanghai, and Nanking), and Cairo.

Hotels

In 1894 Compagnie Internationale des Grands Hotels was founded as a subsidiary and began operating a chain of luxury hotels in major cities. Among these were the Hôtel Terminus in Bordeaux and Marseille, the Hôtel Pera Palace in Istanbul, the Hôtel de la Plage in Ostend, and the Grand Hôtel des Wagons-Lits in Beijing (Peking).

Competition with Mitropa
With the start of World War I CIWL's coaches were confiscated for military use. In Germany and Austro-Hungary Mitropa was founded to take over the property and services of CIWL. In 1919, the communists in Russia expropriated CIWL's local rolling stock and hotels. After the conclusion of World War I CIWL demanded to have its central European service routes restored. It regained these for Austria, Poland, and Czechoslovakia; however, in Germany the Reichsbahn and Mitropa sabotaged this process. On April 23, 1925, CIWL and Mitropa agreed to separate spheres of influence. CIWL received transit routes through Germany and routes between Germany and Belgium, France, Italy, Poland, Latvia, Lithuania and Czechoslovakia. Mitropa took over the routes between Germany and the Netherlands and Scandinavia, as well as trains within Germany, and to Gdańsk. Trains between Germany and Austria were served by both companies.

In the interwar period, CIWL flourished again. The company's blue and gold livery was introduced. In 1925 Wagon-Lits opened its first Travel Palace in Paris. Services extended to the Middle Eastern cities of Aleppo, Baghdad, Cairo, and Tehran. Metal coaches, replacing older wooden ones constructed of teak, became available in 1926. In 1931 the fleet reached its maximum of 2268 vehicles. This period can be considered the zenith of luxury rail travel. CIWL's carriages were decorated by such renowned artists as Réné Prou, René Lalique and Morrison. CIWL also commissioned renowned artists such as Adolphe Mouron Cassandre to design posters advertising its services.

Decline 
With Anschluss in 1938, the Austrian market was lost to Mitropa (it was recovered after 1945). Because of World War II and the subsequent communist expansion, CIWL lost more markets in central and eastern Europe.

After World War II, CIWL increasingly focused on the travel agency and management business. Accordingly, it was renamed Compagnie Internationale des Wagons-Lits et du Tourisme (CIWLT) in 1967, and later just called Wagons-Lits.

By 1971 the rolling stock of CIWL had become aged and outdated, and the renovation and replacement needed were beyond the company. It sold or leased its coaches to the SNCF, FS, SBB, DB, ÖBB, NMBS/SNCB, NS, DSB and Renfe. An international sleeping car pool named TEN (Trans Euro Night) was founded at that time and took over and managed (until 1995) many of the carriages of CIWL and of the Mitropa-successor DSG.

Today
Wagons-Lits is headquartered in Paris. Currently CIWL provides service on night trains in Austria, Italy and Portugal and meal and catering services in daytime trains of France, Italy, Portugal and on Eurostar services to the United Kingdom.

A number of sleeping-cars on the European continent are owned by CIWL. The cars are maintained by the sister company Rail Service International (RSI) in the Netherlands and leased to train operating companies.

Corporate history
The company currently operates in Austria, France, Italy, Portugal, Spain, and the UK. The specifics of the services provided vary based on mergers and splits within the company and the surrounding business climate.

Thomas Cook
In 1927, Thomas Cook was sold to CIWL after poor financial results; CIWL took a back-role in the running of the subsidiary.

Accor
In 1991, Wagons-Lits became part of the French multi-national Accor Hotel and Leisure Group.

At the time, CIWL included the hotel brands Altea, Arcade, Etap, PLM and Pullman. Catering organisation Eurest and, in the automobile world, Wagons-Lits included Europcar rental and motorway break specialists Relais Autoroute.

Following the 1992 purchase, the Pullman hotels were gradually rebranded to Sofitel, allowing the Pullman name to be reused in 2007 for a new class of conference hotel. Sixty-eight existing Accor hotels will be transferred over, including some Sofitel that were originally Pullman hotels.

In May 2011, Accor announced plans to auction residual historic assets of Wagons-Lits, including posters and tableware.

Wagons-Lits Diffusion
In 1996, all copyrights and trademarks concerning the use of historical brands and archive photographs were transferred to Wagons-Lits Diffusion in Paris. Wagons-Lits Diffusion manages the historic brands and logos derived from Compagnie des Wagons-Lits past activities.

Newrest
In July 2010, the rail catering operations of Wagons-Lits were transferred from Accor to the catering company Newrest, since then operating under the name Newrest Wagons-Lits.

Carlson Wagonlit Travel

In 1997, the Europe business travel and leisure retail arm of Wagons-Lits (Wagonlit Travel) was merged on an equal basis with that of Carlson Travel Network (operating in the United States). The result was a new company called "Carlson Wagonlit Travel" jointly owned by Accor and Carlson Holdings Inc., the former parent companies of the merged entities.

The Carlson side of the merger had grown from a travel agency founded by Ward Forster in the United States in 1888. Originally called "Ask Mr. Foster Travel Agency", the chain was renamed to "Carlson Travel Network" following an earlier purchase by the Carlson Group and later to CWT.

Accor sold its 50% of Carlson Wagonlit Travel in 2006 for €500m to Carlson and One Equity Partners. However, Accor maintains its interest in the railway service sector of Wagon Lits.

Famous CIWL trains

Orient Express

From 1883, the Orient Express operated between Paris and Istanbul in three nights and three times per week in each direction. The Orient Express deployed the first sleeping and dining cars for long-distance train travel in Europe. In 2003, the company restored seven cars of the famous Pullman Orient Express and made it available for tourist events. After 2007, the night sleeper service named Orient Express only operated between Strasbourg and Vienna. Made obsolete by Europe's high-speed rail network, the Orient Express made its last run on 14 December 2009.

Nord Express

The Northern Express connected Paris with St. Petersburg (later Riga), via Germany, Poland and Eastern Europe. Begun in 1884, the service is now run by DB NachtZug from Paris as far as Hamburg, although it previously served Copenhagen.

The famous Art Deco poster "Nord Express: (1927) by Cassandre (Adolphe Mouron Cassandre) shows a stylised version of the train that traveled from London and Paris to Riga and Warsaw (Varsovie)

Sud Express

The Southern Express connected Paris–Lisbon starting in 1887, to provide the second-half of the through connection from St. Petersburg (Finland/Russia) via Paris to the west coast of Portugal. In Lisbon, travellers could transfer to trans-Atlantic steamships.

Train Bleu

The Blue Train linked Paris/Calais–Southern France overnight and used Wagons-Lits cars up until 1938. It was actually operated by French company called Chemins de fer de Paris à Lyon et à la Méditerranée.

Transsibérien

The Trans-Siberian Express operated with the permission of the Russian Tsar until 1917 during World War I. The service ran from Moscow to Vladivostok and Peking, taking over one week in each direction.

Night Ferry

The Night Ferry was a through London Victoria to Paris Gare du Nord overnight boat train. Wagons-Lits operated the service from October 1936 until December 1976 with specially constructed cars designed to fit the smaller British loading gauge. It was taken over by British Rail in January 1977, before ceasing in October 1980. Before the introduction of high-speed Eurostar services, this was the only through service. The train's English Channel segment between Dover and Dunkirk was made by train ferry.

London Vichy Pullman Express

The Londres-Vichy Pullman Express ran between London and Vichy in France primarily to serve visitors to Vichy's famous thermal baths. Compagnie Internationale des Wagons-Lits operated the service from 14 May 1927 until 19 September 1930.

List of CIWL services
Basic data is listed. Further details are in the article regarding the specific train.

1918 Armistice coach

The 1918 Armistice with Germany was signed in CIWL #2419. Returned to CIWL service afterwards, it was retired later to join the French presidential train before being withdrawn in 1921 and placed on display in the Cour des Invalides, Paris until 1927, when it was moved to Compiègne for display. It remained on display in its own building, the Clairiere de l'Armistice until 1940, when it was removed by the German army and used to receive the 1940 Armistice with France between France and Nazi Germany. Following this, the carriage itself was taken to Berlin as a trophy of war, along with pieces of a large stone tablet which bore the inscription (in French):

Here on the Eleventh of November 1918 Succumbed the Criminal Pride of the German Reich. Vanquished by the Free Peoples Which it Tried to Enslave..

Following this period of display in Berlin, CIWL #2419 was moved to Ohrdruf in Thuringia for storage in 1945. Following the Allied advance into Germany in early 1945, the detachment of SS troops protecting the carriage set it ablaze before burying the remains to prevent them from falling into Allied hands. Some remnants were later exhumed and moved back to the restored Compiègne site for display, while CIWL later donated another carriage from the same construction order, 1913-built CIWL #2439, in 1950 as a replacement. This carriage had also been at Compiègne on 11 November 1918, and it was renumbered as #2419D for display at Compiègne where it was installed on Armistice Day 1950.

CIWL phototheque and historical archives
CIWL archives are rich of more than 100 years of posters, historical photos, plans and communication material that represent a tremendous interest for cultural, academic or commercial projects. The greatest creators and artists have been hired by CIWL since 1883 in order to create luxury conditions and comfort in travel, as well as a particular graphic style that is now recognized worldwide by its quality. Great effort are made to digitalize images (photos, plans and posters), where as vast paper archives are preserved, waiting to be sorted and classified in a near future.
As of today, available digital archives consist of more than 250 CIWL posters, 800 Paris–Lyon–Méditerranée (PLM) posters and more than 6,000 archives photos. Probably one of the most extensive poster collection in the world from the end of nineteenth century to the late 1950s. 
These archives are regularly used for all types of publishing and media projects.

In popular culture
Agatha Christie set two of her Hercule Poirot mysteries on or around CIWL trains:
 Murder on the Orient Express, set on the Orient Express.
 The Mystery of the Blue Train, set on the Calais-Mediterranée Express.
 She also mentioned the Orient Express in one of her Parker Pyne short stories: “Have you got everything you want?”.

Sidney Gilliat and Clifford Grey wrote the script for the 1932 British film directed by Walter Forde:
 Rome Express, set on the Rome Express.

In 1991, David Copperfield performed a televised illusion which caused a recently restored "Orient Express dining car" (in fact an American dining car decorated in Wagon-Lits colours) to seemingly vanish into thin air.

CIWL model railway cars have been manufactured by many companies including Märklin, Fleischmann, Trix, Lima (models), Jouef, Bachmann, France Trains, LS Models and Tri-ang.
Rivarossi also produced very detailed models, discontinued in the late nineties, production restarted lately with the new society affiliated to Hornby.

CIWL in different languages 

 / 

Bulgarian: Компания на международните спални вагони и големите европейски експреси

References

Further reading
 illustrated account of the company and its services down to 1936

External links

An abridged history
 
Collection PPCWL of Wagons-Lits objects
[*CIWL brand and archive image database

Accor
Railway companies of France
International rail transport
Railway companies established in 1872
Foodservice companies
Railway companies of Belgium
French companies established in 1872